Derrington-Francis Racing Team was a short-lived Formula One team from Britain. It was founded by Stirling Moss' former chief mechanic, Alf Francis, and engine tuner Vic Derrington, acquiring an old Automobili Turismo e Sport Tipo 100 car after the ATS operation had closed in 1963. The car, named the Derrington-Francis ATS after the team's founders, featured a spaceframe chassis, a short wheelbase and square-shaped aluminium body panels.

The car made its début in the 1964 Italian Grand Prix, where it was driven by Portuguese driver Mario de Araujo Cabral. Qualifying 19th on the grid, Cabral fought with Peter Revson and Maurice Trintignant for the first part of the race, before an ignition problem forced him to retire on lap 25. Cabral was to have driven the car in future events, but Dan Gurney damaged the single chassis in private testing and the team did not make another race appearance.

Complete Formula One World Championship results
(key)

References

Formula One constructors
Formula One entrants
1964 establishments in the United Kingdom
1964 disestablishments in the United Kingdom
British auto racing teams
British racecar constructors
Auto racing teams established in 1964
Auto racing teams disestablished in 1964